Isis is a female first name.

Meaning

The initial popularity of the name derived from its association with the goddess Isis of the Egyptian pantheon. Her strong character has subsequently been adopted as an axiom among feminists.

Since 2014, the name Isis has decreased significantly in the United States, Canada, United Kingdom and Australia, due to the name being associated with the jihadist terrorist organization Islamic State of Iraq and Syria (ISIS). There have been many name changes as well.

Given name

 Isis Anchalee (b. 1993), creator of the #ilooklikeanengineer gender equality campaign
 Isis Casalduc (born 1981), Puerto Rican beauty pageant titleholder and model
 Isis Finlay (1934–2007), 1954 Miss Cuba
 Isis Gaston (born 2000), rapper known as Ice Spice
 Isis Gomes (born 1985), Brazilian model
 Isis Holt (born 2001), paralympic athlete in T35 sprint events with multiple world records
 Isis King (born 1985), the first trans woman to compete on America's Next Top Model
 Isis Nyong'o, Kenyan American media and technology leader in Africa
 Isis Pogson (1852–1945), British astronomer and meteorologist
 Isis Rodriguez (born 1964), American painter that focuses on the empowerment and liberation of women
 Ísis Valverde (born 1987), Brazilian actress titled multiple awards

Surname
 María Isis (María Jesús), daughter of Mexican army general Agustín de Iturbide

References

Feminine given names